Woodburn is a census-designated place in Fairfax County, Virginia, United States. The population as of the 2010 census was 8,480.

Geography
Bounded by the Capital Beltway (I-495) to the east, Arlington Boulevard (US 50) to the north, Prosperity Avenue to the west, and Little River Turnpike (SR 236) to the south, the CDP is home to Inova Fairfax Hospital. Neighboring communities are Annandale to the east, Wakefield to the south, Mantua to the west, Merrifield to the north, and West Falls Church at the northeast corner of Woodburn.

References

Census-designated places in Fairfax County, Virginia
Washington metropolitan area
Census-designated places in Virginia